A synchronoptic view is a graphic display of a number of entities as they proceed through time. A synchronoptic view can be used for many purposes, but is best suited to the visual display of history. A number of related timelines can be drawn on a single chart, showing which events and lives are contemporary and which are unconnected.

A synchronoptic view has important educational advantages. Visible information is much more easily learned, than when it is presented only in pure text form. History is an ideal subject for a synchronoptic view. Multiple timelines are able to show how events interacted. Multiple lifelines can show which people were contemporaries.
(See example)

A combination of maps is also synchronoptic when it displays successive moments in time.

Etymology
The concept in question is made visual — hence optic.
The elements are displayed synchronously: i.e., which events in one area happened at the same time as events in another seemingly unrelated area.
Thus synchron-optic.

Synchronoptic also means visible at the same time", or "with parallel views". i.e., The user gets a view of all the information in one go.

Carte chronographique

Jacques Barbeu-Dubourg (1709–1779) was the first to develop a synchronoptical visualisation with his Chronographie universelle & details qui en dependent pour la Chronologie & les Genealogies (1753) abbreviated to Carte chronographique. The horizontal axis representing the passage of time was consistent throughout, but the vertical axis was varied depending on the categories Barbeu-Dubourg considered relevant for that period of history.

References

External links
 Hyper History Online. A good example of a synchronoptic view of history
 Adams Synchronological Chart

See also 

 Adams Synchronological Chart

Chronology
Visualization (graphics)